Michael Oluwadurotimi Obafemi (born 6 July 2000) is an Irish professional footballer who plays as a striker for EFL Championship club Burnley, on loan from Swansea City, and the  Irish national team.

Early life 
Obafemi was born in Dublin to Nigerian parents. While he was still an infant, his family moved to England and he was raised in the London area. His older brother Afolabi Obafemi is also a footballer.

Club career
Obafemi was released by Watford prior to his 14th birthday in 2014. He took a year out of the game before joining Leyton Orient in 2015, moving on to Southampton in 2016.

Southampton
Obafemi made his professional debut for Southampton as a substitute in the 82nd minute of a 1–1 draw with Tottenham Hotspur on 21 January 2018. Aged 17 years and 199 days, Obafemi became the second youngest player to make a Premier League appearance for Southampton after Luke Shaw, who was 17 years and 116 days old.

He scored his first professional goal with the third goal in a 3–1 victory at Huddersfield on 22 December 2018; at 18 years and 169 days old, he became Southampton's youngest scorer in the Premier League.

Swansea City
On 31 August 2021, Obafemi joined Swansea City for a fee reported to be between £1.5 and £2 million, signing a three-year contract. On 23 October 2021, Obafemi scored his first goal for Swansea in their 2–1 defeat to Birmingham City.

On Summer Deadline Day 2022, Swansea rejected a number of bids from Burnley for Obafemi with the striker subsequently being left out of the team with concerns from manager Russell Martin over the striker's attitude.

Burnley (loan)
On 29 January 2023, Obafemi joined Burnley on loan for the remainder of the season, with the option to make the transfer permanent at the end of the season.

International career
Obafemi was eligible to represent England, Nigeria, and the Republic of Ireland. In November 2018 he committed to the Republic of Ireland.

Obafemi represented the Republic of Ireland at under-19 level, debuting during the 2019 UEFA European Under-19 Championship qualification campaign.

On 6 November 2018, Obafemi was named in the senior Republic of Ireland squad for the first time for the friendly against Northern Ireland on 15 November and the UEFA Nations League match against Denmark on 19 November 2018. He came on as a substitute in the second half of the 0–0 draw against Denmark to make his debut. He also became the first player born in the 2000s to win a senior cap for Ireland. Obafemi made his debut for the Republic of Ireland under-21 team on 10 October 2019, coming off the bench, in a 0–0 draw with Italy under-21s at Tallaght Stadium.

On 11 June 2022, he made his first international start at senior level, in a UEFA Nations League match against Scotland, providing one assist (for Troy Parrott) and scoring his first goal, before a groin strain saw Obafemi substituted five minutes after scoring, being replaced by Scott Hogan.

Career statistics

Club

International

References

External links

Michael Obafemi profile at Swansea City AFC

2000 births
Living people
Association footballers from Dublin (city)
Footballers from Greater London
Republic of Ireland association footballers
Republic of Ireland youth international footballers
Association football forwards
Leyton Orient F.C. players
Southampton F.C. players
Swansea City A.F.C. players
Burnley F.C. players
Premier League players
Black Irish sportspeople
Irish people of Nigerian descent
Irish sportspeople of African descent
Republic of Ireland international footballers